David Davidovich Burliuk (Давид Давидович Бурлюк; 21 July 1882 – 15 January 1967) was a Russian-language poet, artist and publicist associated with the Futurist and Neo-Primitivist movements. Burliuk has been described as "the father of Russian Futurism."

Biography

Early life
David Burliuk was born on 21 July 1882 in the village of Riabushky (near Lebedyn, Ukraine) in the Kharkov Governorate of the Russian Empire. Burliuk's family was artistically inclined; two of his brothers were talented artists as well, Nikolai and Volodimir Burliuk. The Burliuk family partly descended from Ukrainian Cossacks on their father's side, who held premier positions in the Hetmanate. His mother, Ludmyla Mikhnevich, was of ethnic Belarusian descent.

Education, career
From 1898 to 1904, he studied at Kazan and Odesa art schools, as well as at the Royal Academy in Munich. His exuberant, extroverted character was recognized by Anton Azhbe, his professor at the Munich Academy, who called Burliuk a "wonderful wild steppe horse".

In 1907, he made contact with the Russian art world; he met and befriended Mikhail Larionov, and they are both credited as being major forces in bringing together the contemporary art world. In 1908, an exhibition with the group Zveno ("The Link") in Kiev was organized by David Burliuk together with Wladimir Baranoff-Rossine, Alexander Bogomazov, his brother Volodymyr (Wladimir) Burliuk and Aleksandra Ekster. The exhibition was a flop, especially because they were all unknown painters. The Burliuks and Larionov left for the aforementioned brothers' home in Chernianka, also known as Hylea; it was during this stay that their work became more Avant-Garde. That autumn, while visiting Ekster, they organized an exhibition which took place in the street; it was a success, and enough money was raised to go to Moscow.

In 1909, Burliuk painted a portrait of his future wife, Marussia, on a background of flowers and rocks on the Crimean coast. Many times thereafter he would set the image of his wife to canvas. Without question, two dreams possessed his heart all his life: the face of his wife and the portrait of his Ukraine and then his adopted country, the United States.

The Futurist literary group Hylaea ( [Gileya]) was initiated in 1910 by David Burlyuk and his brothers at their aforementioned estate near Kherson, and were quickly joined by Vasily Kamensky and Velimir Khlebnikov, with Aleksey Kruchenykh and Vladimir Mayakovsky joining in 1911). Soon afterwards, the group would morph into literary Cubo-Futurism, the predominant form of Futurism in Russia.

From the start to the end, Cubo-Futurism always had an air of scandal about it. The artists and poets scandalized the public by walking in public spaces wearing ridiculous clothes and painting their faces, by writing plays incomprehensible to the public (the most notorious being Victory over the Sun, about a group of Futurists aiming to destroy reason), and by the fights between them and the audience at their poetry recitations. In 1913–4, Mayakovsky, Kamensky, and Burliuk decided to go on poetry tours; fury almost always followed, even on an occasion when Mayakovsky read Pushkin. Alexander Rodchenko later claimed that that specific recital "was the first time I had seen such a frenzied, furious audience". Even during the First World War their activities carried on: at the 1915 Christmas Party, hosted by Lilya and Osip Brik, the tree was hung from the roof, upside-down, and the guests arrived with vegetables in their buttonholes and in bizarre makeup. Russian Futurism would only end after the Revolution of 1917.

Most of the Cubo-Futurists also resisted the Futurists in Italy. A brief alliance with their rivals, the Ego-Futurists, did not end very well. Burliuk's colleague Velimir Khlebnikov also developed Zaum, a poetry style.

From 1910, he was the member of the group Jack of Diamonds, and from 1910 to 1911 he attended the Art School in Odessa. After 1911, David concentrated on poetry and manifestoes, and at Christmas he made the acquaintance of Benedikt Livshits, a poet. From 1911 to 1913, he studied at the Moscow School of Painting, Sculpture and Architecture (MUZHVZ), and that year participated in the group exhibition of the Blaue Reiter in Munich, which also included his brother Wladimir. He also contributed an article to the Blaue Reiter Almanac.

In December 1912, Burliuk was co-author and one of the many signatories of the manifesto A Slap in the Face of Public Taste with the other members of Hylaea, one of the major manifestoes of Russian Futurism, a movement of Russian poets and artists who adopted the principles of Filippo Marinetti's "Futurist Manifesto".

In 1913, he was expelled from the Art Academy, as well as Mayakovsky. In the same year, Burliuk founded the publishing venture of the futurist writer's group Hylaea. In 1914, he and his brother Wladimir illustrated Kamensky's Tango with Cows, and in 1915 Burliuk published the book The Support of the Muses in Spring, with illustrations by Aristarkh Lentulov, and by David and Wladimir Burliuk.

From 1915 to 1917, he resided in the Urals with frequent trips to Moscow and Petrograd (St. Petersburg). In 1917, he participated in an exhibition with the group Jack of Diamonds in the artists' salon in Moscow, which included Aleksandra Ekster and Kazimir Malevich.

In 1916, his brother Wladimir Burliuk was drafted into military service, and in 1917 was killed in World War I in Saloniki. The next year, following the downfall of anarchism (he had befriended anarchists during the time he lived in an abandoned house), Burliuk fled Russia and began his journey to the United States, a process that took him through Siberia, Japan, and Canada which was not complete until 1922. He kept in contact with his fellow Futurists in Russia, and, despite not knowing a word of English, managed to befriend artist and patron Katherine Dreier, establishing himself among the artists of that country. In 1922, he settled in the United States.

In 1924 Burliuk published two Radio-style manifestos detailing a utopian art that would transcend space-time and aid in humanity's pursuit of knowledge and perfection. A collasal sized painting from this period titled Advent of the Mechanical Man, 1925–26, was exhibited in the Brooklyn Museum's 1926 International Exhibition of Modern Art Assembled by Société Anonyme.

In New York, Burliuk developed activity in pro-Soviet oriented groups and, having written a poem for the 10th anniversary of the October Revolution, sought, in particular, to gain recognition as the "father of Russian futurism". He was a regular contributor to the Russian Voice newspaper. Burliuk published his collections, brochures, and magazines together with his wife Maria Nikiforovna, and through friends he distributed these publications mainly within the USSR.

In 1925, Burliuk was a co-founder of the Association of Revolutionary Masters of Ukraine (ARMU) with the members Alexander Bogomazov, Vasiliy Yermilov, Vadym Meller, Alexander Khvostenko-Khvostov, and Palmov Victor. In 1927, he participated in an exhibition of the Latest Artistic Trends in the Russian Museum in Leningrad (St. Petersburg), together with Kazimir Malevich, Aleksandr Shevchenko, and Vladimir Tatlin. Burliuk was author of autobiographical sketches My Ancestors, Forty Years: 1890–1930.

Later years
In the 1930s, Onya La Tour was an avid collector of modern art who acquired at least one hundred works by Burliuk.

In 1940, Burliuk petitioned the Soviet government for a request to visit his homeland. In exchange, he offered a sizeable collection of archival material pertaining to his contemporary and friend Vladimir Mayakovsky, which Burliuk offered to donate to the Mayakovsky Museum in addition to over 100 original paintings. Burliuk's requests were denied. He was allowed to visit the Soviet Union only in 1956 and 1965.

In 1945, an exhibit was mounted at Irving Place Theater in New York City

In 1962, he and his wife traveled to Australia where he held an exhibition at Moreton Galleries, Brisbane. It was his only Australian exhibition. During his stay there, Burliuk painted some sketches and works with Australian views. From 1937 to 1966, Burliuk and his wife, Marusia, published Color & Rhyme, a journal primarily concerned with charting Burliuk's activities.

Burliuk lived in Hampton Bays on Long Island for approximately 20 years until he died at Southampton Hospital in Southampton, New York. His house and studio still remain.

Legacy
In Russian poetry, Burliuk is regarded as a trailblazer. In 1990, the Russian Academy of Futurist Poetry established the David Burliuk Prize (Otmetina) for experimental poetry awarded annually.

Trivia
Burliuk appears in Part III of the Vladimir Mayakovsky's landmark poem A Cloud in Trousers (A Cloud in Pants, 1915).
A painting (most likely fictional) by Burliuk appears in the novel Chapayev and Void by Viktor Pelevin. The painting is described as a black writing though a stencil of the word GOD.

Gallery

Publishing history

1912: co-author of the Russian Futurist manifesto A Slap in the Face of Public Taste. 
1915: The Support of the Muses in Spring

References

External links

Exhibition Futurism and After: David Burliuk, 1882–1967 The Ukrainian Museum in New York, USA. October 31, 2008 - April 26, 2009
David Burliuk. Russian Art in America. New York, 1928.
Exhibition Crossroads: Modernism in Ukraine, 1910–1930, (2006–2007) The Ukrainian Museum in New York, USA.
REVISITING THE PAST: David Burliuk, father of Ukrainian Futurism in America
Figureworks.com/20th Century work at www.figureworks.com
English translations of 4 poems, 1910–1915
Includes English translations of four poems, 109–112
English translations of 5 poems, 1910–1916

1882 births
1967 deaths
People from Sumy Oblast
People from Kharkov Governorate
Russian Futurist painters
Ukrainian Futurist painters
Futurist writers
Russian avant-garde
20th-century Russian poets
20th-century Russian painters
Russian male painters
20th-century Ukrainian painters
20th-century Ukrainian male artists
20th-century Russian male artists
Neo-primitivism
Ukrainian avant-garde
Ukrainian Futurism
Russian male poets
Emigrants from the Russian Empire to the United States
Ukrainian male painters
Moscow School of Painting, Sculpture and Architecture alumni
Members of the American Academy of Arts and Letters